National Highway 117 (NH 117) is a national highway in India. This route was earlier part of old national highway 31. It is a secondary route of National Highway 17. NH-117 runs through the state of Assam in India.

Route
NH117 connects North Salmara and Bijni in the state of Assam in India.

Junctions 

  Terminal near Tulungia, North Salmara
  Terminal near Rakhaldubi near Bongaigaon.

See also 
 National Highway 12 (formerly numbered 117 and part of which due for return to state)
 List of National Highways in India
 List of National Highways in India by state
 National Highways Development Project

References

External links 
NH 117 on OpenStreetMap

National Highways in Assam
National highways in India